Birth Stories is a Canadian documentary television series that aired from 2000 to 2004 on Slice. It is produced by Cineflix, Slice and Sky Living.

Synopsis
The series follows the life of women who have babies, showing challenging events in their personal life.

References

External links
Official website
Production website
Birth Stories at LocateTV

Slice (TV channel) original programming
English-language television shows
2000 Canadian television series debuts
2004 Canadian television series endings
2000s Canadian documentary television series